Francis Lawrence is an American music video director and film director.

Francis Lawrence may also refer to:

Francis Lawrence of Saint Lawrence, cardinal and theologian aka Lorenzo Cozza
Francis Leo Lawrence (1937–2013), eighteenth president of Rutgers University

See also
Frances Lawrence (disambiguation)
Francis Lawrence Jobin (1914–1995), Canadian politician